Viva Radio 2 was an Italian radio program aired from 2001 to 2008 on Rai Radio 2.

Content
The show was based on  Fiorello's imitations, who is an acclaimed TV star. It is co-hosted  with DJ Marco Baldini and music director Enrico Cremonesi. The show was written by Rosario Fiorello, Marco Baldini, Riccardo Cassini, Alberto Di Risio, Francesco Bozzi, and Federico Taddia.

Partial list of imitated characters
Roberto Alagna
Kimi Räikkönen
prince Albert of Monaco
Francesco Amadori
Franco Battiato
Silvio Berlusconi (always called Cologno's forgetful)
Tony Blair, English prime minister
Mike Bongiorno
Carla Bruni
Franco Califano
Andrea Camilleri, author
Marco Carta
Antonio Cassano
Vincent Cassel
Roberto Cavalli
Carlo Azeglio Ciampi, former president
Giuseppe Ciarrapico
Riccardo Cocciante
Maurizio Costanzo, TV host
Pino Daniele, singer
Umberto Eco, novelist, literary critic, philosopher, semiotician and university professor
Erdoğan, Turkish Prime minister at the time
Father Georg Gänswein
Francesco Guccini, singer
Kim Jong-il
Ignazio La Russa, former defence minister
Carlo Lucarelli
Don Antonio Mazzi
fictional lawyer Messina (a parody of Carlo Taormina)
Monsignor Emmanuel Milingo
Gianni Minà, journalist
Federico Moccia, author
Gianni Morandi, singer
Massimo Moratti, former owner of FC Internazionale
Nanni Moretti
Silvio Muccino
Giorgio Napolitano, former president
Nicoletta Orsomando, TV announcer
Barbara Palombelli
Romano Prodi, former prime minister
Vladimir Putin, Russian Federation president
Quasimodo of Notre Dame
Vasco Rossi, singer
Tony Sperandeo
Oliviero Toscani
director and host of a fictional calabrese Television who emulate RAI TV programs
Bruno Vespa, TV host
Martano Volpi
Henry John Woodcock, former prosecutor of Potenza

Viva Radio 2 on TV
Viva Radio 2 was aired on TV on Rai Uno beginning in December 2006, and was broadcast every evening on Rai Uno in weekday access prime time from 21 January 2008 to 2 February 2008 under the name Viva Radio 2... minuti.

References 

Italian radio programs